Harlequin (known as Dark Forces in US) is a 1980 Australian thriller film directed by Simon Wincer and starring Robert Powell, Carmen Duncan, David Hemmings and Broderick Crawford. The film is a modern-day retelling of the historical figure Rasputin.

Synopsis 
An up-and-coming United States Senator, Nick Rast, has a young son who is terminally ill with leukaemia. A mysterious faith healer, Gregory Wolfe, appears and seems to cure the boy. Rast's wife Sandy falls in love with Wolfe, but the powerful interests behind Rast's career, represented by geriatric monster, Doc Wheelan are less happy with events.

Cast 
 Robert Powell as Gregory Wolfe
 David Hemmings as Nick Rast
 Broderick Crawford as Doc Wheelan
 Carmen Duncan as Sandy Rast
 Alyson Best as Alice
 Alan Cassell as Mr Porter
 Mark Spain as Alex Rast

Production

Development
Simon Wincer and Everett De Roche had previously collaborated on Snapshot but were not happy with the film since it was made so hurriedly. They decided to make another film, came up with six ideas and eventually chose The Minister's Musician, a modern-day version of the Rasputin story. They did a treatment and Antony I. Ginnane became involved as producer.

Everett de Roche originally did a 400-page first draft in which the central character, Gregory Wolfe, was a priest. When the producers sent the script to the US, they were worried that this would make the film hard to market in Catholic countries so it was changed. The script was given to some American writers to work on but Wincer was not happy with the changes. As de Roche was not available, Wincer went over the script with Russell Hagg although he later said he would have preferred it if de Roche had done the job.

Casting
The script was written with David Bowie in mind for the lead role and conversations were had with Bowie but the filmmakers got "cold feet" at the last minute and cast Robert Powell. The original choice for the role of the senator was Orson Welles but he wanted $80,000 a week for two weeks so Broderick Crawford was cast instead.

Shooting
It was the first film funded by the newly formed West Australian Film Council. Funding also came from the Australian Film Commission, Greater Union, Ace Theatres of Western Australia and Pact Productions, with the final $50,000 coming from Hemdale. It was the first of several films Ginnane would make with Hemdale.

The movie was shot in late 1979 over six weeks, using Panavision. It was filmed in Western Australia because of the involvement of the West Australian Film Council, which was estimated to save the production $100,000.

The film makes a great effort to disguise the fact it is set in Australia, including dubbing Alan Cassel's voice into an American accent and referring to the American political system. This was controversial at the time because it was made with money from Australian taxpayers.

Reception 
The film performed poorly at the Australian box office but was very successful overseas. Simon Wincer says it was particularly successful in South America, due in part to Robert Powell's popularity there.

Accolades

DVD releases 
In Australia, Harlequin was released on an All Region DVD by Umbrella Entertainment on Wednesday, 27 October 2004. It was presented in a remastered 2.35:1 Anamorphic Widescreen, and Special Features were an Audio Commentary by director Simon Wincer and producer Antony I. Ginnane, a theatrical trailer and a photo gallery.

In the US, Harlequin was released as Dark Forces by Image Ent. on 8 June 2004. It was presented in 2.35:1 Widescreen, with Behind The Scenes Photo Gallery, Filmographies, Isolated Music Score and an Audio Commentary by director Simon Wincer and producer Antony I. Ginnane. It was released on Blu-ray in the US by Scorpion Releasing on 29 October 2013 under its original title.

References

Sources 
Peter Beilby & Scott Murray, 'Simon Wincer', Cinema Papers Dec-Jan 1979-80

External links 
 
 
 Harlequin at the National Film and Sound Archive
 Harlequin at Australian Screen Online
Harlequin at Oz Movies

1980 films
1980 horror films
1980s political thriller films
1980s supernatural thriller films
Australian thriller films
1980s English-language films
Australian independent films
Films set in the United States
Films shot in Australia
Films about Grigori Rasputin
Films directed by Simon Wincer
Films scored by Brian May (composer)
Films about faith healing